Live at the Village Vanguard is a live album by American jazz trumpeter Dizzy Gillespie featuring performances recorded in 1967 at the Village Vanguard and originally released on three separate LPs on the Solid State label, one under the "Vanguard" title and as two volumes entitled Jazz for a Sunday Afternoon. The recordings were subsequently re-released in unedited form as a 2-CD set on the Blue Note label in 1993.

Reception
The Allmusic review stated "These lengthy performances (all but one of the seven songs are over 11 minutes) contain some loose and rambling moments but also plenty of creative playing by this unusual group of all-stars".

Track listing
All compositions by Dizzy Gillespie except as indicated

Disc One:
 "Birk's Works" – 17:57 Originally released in edited form on Live at the Village Vanguard but mis-titled "Dizzy's Blues"
 "Lullaby of the Leaves" (Bernice Petkere, Joe Young) – 13:30 Originally released in edited form on Jazz for a Sunday Afternoon Volume 1
 "Lover, Come Back to Me" (Oscar Hammerstein II, Sigmund Romberg) – 19:15 Originally released on Jazz for a Sunday Afternoon Vol 1 
 "Blues for Max" – 9:10 Originally released on both Live at the Village Vanguard and Jazz for a Sunday Afternoon Volume 1
Disc Two:
 "Tour de Force" – 11:51 Originally released in edited form on both Live at the Village Vanguard and Jazz for a Sunday Afternoon Volume 2
 "On the Trail" (Ferde Grofe) – 16:43 Originally released in edited form on Jazz for a Sunday Afternoon Volume 2
 "Sweet Georgia Brown" (Ben Bernie, Maceo Pinkard, Kenneth Casey) – 16:19 Originally released on Jazz for a Sunday Afternoon Vol 2

Personnel
Dizzy Gillespie – trumpet
Pepper Adams – baritone saxophone
Ray Nance – violin (Disc one)
Garnett Brown – Trombone (Disc two)
Chick Corea – piano
Richard Davis – bass
Elvin Jones (Disc One, tracks 1 & 2), Mel Lewis (Disc One, tracks 3 & 4 and Disc Two) – drums

References 

Blue Note Records live albums
Solid State Records (jazz label) live albums
Dizzy Gillespie live albums
1967 live albums
Albums produced by Sonny Lester
Albums recorded at the Village Vanguard